Surrey Quays is a station on the East London Line of the London Overground. It is located in Rotherhithe, part of London Borough of Southwark. Closed in late 2007, the station was refurbished and re-opened as part of the London Overground network on 27 April 2010.

History

The station was built by the East London Railway Company and opened on 7 December 1869; it was originally known as Deptford Road. On 17 July 1911, it was renamed Surrey Docks in reference to the nearby, now closed, Surrey Commercial Docks, and further renamed Surrey Quays on 24 October 1989, following the construction of the nearby Surrey Quays Shopping Centre. This was a somewhat controversial move as some of the local community felt that their heritage was being eroded. However, the name stuck, and the Surrey Docks part of Rotherhithe is now often referred to as Surrey Quays.

In the 1950s and 1960s, London Underground planned a new line connecting north-west and south-east London. Approval for the first stage of the Fleet line (renamed the Jubilee line in 1975) to Charing Cross was granted in 1969, with second and third stages approved in 1971 and 1972. The station was planned to be part of phase 3 running to Lewisham. New tunnels to and from the City of London would have come to the surface north of the station. East London line trains would have terminated at Surrey Docks with London Underground services to New Cross and New Cross Gate being taken over by the new line. Phases 2 and 3 were not carried out due to a lack of funds. Eventually, due to changing land usage and the growth of Canary Wharf, the Jubilee line was extended via Canada Water instead.

For much of its history, the station's importance lay in its proximity to the Surrey Commercial Docks; it was at the south end of Canada Dock (now Canada Water) and a few hundred yards from the principal entrance to the docks. Its usage fell considerably after the docks closed, but revived following the redevelopment of the London Docklands in the 1980s and 1990s.

The service was closed between 1995 and 1998 due to repair work on the East London line's Thames Tunnel. The East London line closed permanently as an Underground line on 22 December 2007. On 9 December 2012, Phase 2 of East London line extension opened to the public, launched the next day by the Mayor of London, Boris Johnson. It provides services to  via , thus completing the London Overground Orbital link.

, Transport for London is planning to upgrade the station with a new entrance and ticket hall, improving capacity and introducing step-free access. On 2 February 2023, TfL awarded the contract to start construction, with works due to start in the summer.

Services

All times below are correct as of the December 2015 timetables.

London Overground

Mondays to Saturdays there is a service every 5–10 minutes throughout the day, while on Sundays before 13:00 there is a service every 5–9 minutes, changing to every 7–8 minutes until the end of service after that. Current off peak frequency is:

East London Line
4 southbound to  then to 
4 southbound to Sydenham then to West Croydon
4 southbound to

South London Line
4 northbound to 
4 southbound to

Connections
London Buses routes 1, 47, 188, 199, 225 and 381 and night routes N199 and N381 serve the station.

References

Railway stations in the London Borough of Southwark
Former East London Railway stations
Railway stations in Great Britain opened in 1869
Railway stations served by London Overground
Railway station
1869 establishments in England
London Overground Night Overground stations